Beach Head (also released as Beachhead and Beach-Head) is a fictional character from the G.I. Joe: A Real American Hero toyline, comic books and animated series. He serves as the G.I. Joe Team's sergeant major and debuted in 1986.

Profile
Beach Head's real name is Wayne R. Sneeden. He was born and raised in Auburn, Alabama, living in abject poverty. This led to him being bullied and tormented by his classmates and peers, one of which was notorious lizard man Clay Cox, throughout his growing years. In hopes of becoming more than what those who taunted him believed he could be, Sneeden became an overachiever and ended up the valedictorian of his high school through hard work, unwavering discipline, and his keen mind.

Seeking the next challenge, he enlisted in the US Army, where he went through Airborne and Ranger school Ft. Benning, Georgia. After he completed training there, he went on to join Central America's Covert Ops as an Observer/Advisor. After his training in Central America, he returned to Ft. Benning as a lane instructor. He was then offered a spot in the G.I. Joe team as a Ranger. Beach Head's habits include getting up hours before his teammates and going on a 10-mile run, then undergoing rigorous physical training that would make the most gung-ho of his comrades weary - and all before breakfast.

He is known for his unwavering patience on and off the battlefield, and for his intolerance of anyone not willing to live up to their full potential. Beach Head feels that being pushed to the limits is the only way to develop a solid understanding of what those limits are. The consummate professional, he is determined and ruthless when needed to get the job done. The only matter his teammates have an issue with is his lack of interest in personal hygiene. He disregards things like deodorant, believing that they would be a dead giveaway were he dropped into a jungle war zone at a moment's notice.

Beach Head returned to the US Army while G.I. Joe was disbanded, and was called back to active duty upon reinstatement, to train new recruits and keep the older ones in shape. He has a tradition of assigning numbers to greenshirts until they earn a G.I. Joe codename, which makes them hate Beach Head more than they've ever hated anyone in their life.

In the UK Action Force series, Beach Head is from Auckland in New Zealand. His profile is otherwise very similar.

In the animated show COPS, the character Checkpoint's real name is Wayne Sneeden III. His file states his father was a member of an elite military unit in the 80's and 90's. Both toy lines are owned by Hasbro which puts them in the same shared universe. Also both lines had their bio cards written by Larry Hama.

Toys
Beach Head was first released as part of the fifth series in 1986 as the Joe team's Ranger, and came with a gray Demro XF-7A WASP submachine gun, a large black backpack, and a black bag of ammunition. There are two versions of his ammo case, the earlier version is made of hard plastic which was prone to breakage, and later replaced with one of softer plastic.

In 1993, a new Beach Head figure was released. This one had the face entirely covered. In Brazil, this Beach-Head was released as a Cobra named "Armadilha". The figure was repainted and released as part of the Battle Corps line in 1994.

Visually, Beach Head is almost always seen masked with a green balaclava hood over his face. His actual face varies depending upon the figure: he is seen with either blonde hair (both cut short and normal length), brownish red hair, black hair, and shaved. While most versions have him clean shaven, the only unmasked version of Beach Head has the character sporting a reddish Fu Manchu mustache.

25th anniversary
 Beach Head was released in wave 2 of the G.I. Joe: A Real American Hero 25th Anniversary toyline. A comic pack with Beach Head & Dataframe (Mainframe) was also released.
 Beach Head was released as part of the Internet-exclusive "Hall of Heroes" wave in 2009. He is numbered 5 of 10.
 Beach Head was once again released with the "G.I. Joe Resolute" box set.
 Beach Head has also been released as part of the "Pursuit of Cobra" toy line.

Comic books

Marvel Comics
Beach Head's first appearance in the Marvel Comics G.I. Joe series was in issue #47 (May 1986), alongside of Wet-Suit. Beach Head's first mission on the Joe team was assisting Hawk during the rescue of Snake Eyes from Cobra Island. The rescue was successful, after an off-shore battle with Cobra attack boats and Cobra Eels. He was part of the first team of Joes to enter Springfield before the invasion of that Cobra-controlled town, whose job was to knock out the enemy's power and communications.

Later, Beach Head was part of a group advising Sierra Gordo's counter-revolutionaries in the fight against Cobra, where he once again found himself involved in rescuing Snake Eyes from Cobra's Terror-Drome. He was also one of the many Joes to be involved in the construction of the third Pit headquarters in Utah. Some time later, with a large force of Joes, Beach Head participated in the Cobra Island civil war. He served on the team until it was disbanded in 1994.

G.I. Joe: Special Missions
Beach Head appeared in the sneak preview of Special Missions, published in issue #50 of A Real American Hero in August 1986, taking place right after his first appearance in the regular comic series. Here, he sneaked onto a Russian airliner alongside Flint and Lady Jaye, in order to foil hijackers. The enemy soldiers were all killed. In Special Missions #8, Beach Head and a small team of Joes took part in a near-disastrous mission in the jungles of Southeast Asia, which nearly cost them their lives due to a treacherous CIA agent.

Devil's Due Publishing
Beach Head became part of the reinstated Joe team in 2002, where he acted as a drill sergeant for new recruits, in addition to his usual duties as a Joe.

G.I. Joe: Frontlines
Beach Head made his Frontlines appearance alongside Flash, Tripwire, Airtight and Chuckles, where they fought against terrorist Tyler Wingfield, the son of Vance Wingfield.

He was also featured in issue #17, as he leads a team of new recruits on a very dangerous, very real mission in a war-torn, riot-filled city. One of his men is wounded, and Beach Head apparently orders the man abandoned. This leads to mistrust and hostility on the part of the other soldiers. It is later revealed that Beach Head knew the wounded man was not going to be killed, rather he would be taken to the police station, which was a mission objective. Beach Head and the others rescue their wounded comrade and attempt an escape. Beach Head himself is wounded and despite explicit orders to leave him behind, his men risk their lives to save him, and themselves. Beach Head consistently gives push-ups as punishments, even when the team is under hostile fire.

Special Missions: Manhattan
There are times when the active members of the Elite team are on assignment or too far away to help in a crisis, which is where the reserves come into play. In Manhattan, there is the threat of a biological agent being stolen from a top secret lab; the closest reserve members are Beach Head, Mercer, Low-Light, Cover Girl, and Tunnel Rat. With Beach Head the acting team leader, they send Tunnel Rat in first, since he knows the layout of the building best; with him as their guide, they infiltrate the building. Beach Head sends the wisecracking Mercer to make certain the levels are secure, while Beach Head, Low-Light, and Cover Girl head upstairs to handle the enemy.

While they are en route, Mercer is attacked by a Cobra agent called Neurotoxin; after a display of combat skill and heroics by Beach Head's team, they end up in quarantine along with their target, where they are met by General Joe Colton, who explained there was no bio-agent, that it was a decoy to lure Neurotoxin out of hiding so he could be captured. He and Mercer showed dissatisfaction at the fact they were used in such a manner, essentially putting the lives of the team on the line without their knowledge, even though Tunnel Rat and Cover Girl expressed that the mission had been the "most fun they've had."

G.I. Joe Origins
In the new IDW continuity, Beach Head suffers from amnesia after being attacked saving a village in Guatemala. He is found on a beach, face down in the sand and is taken to a hospital. An American doctor speaks with him, and after showing him his Army Ranger uniform, helps Beach Head remember how he ended up getting shot, but not his own name. The doctor reveals himself to be Duke, and he offers Beach Head a chance to join the team. On their first mission, Beach Head argues about his code name, asking for names like "Night Ranger" or "Wolfman", but is denied the request. When asked, Duke tells him his name is what the nurses called him, "Cabeza de Playa", which is Spanish for Beach Head.

Animated series

Sunbow

Beach Head appeared in the second season of the Sunbow G.I. Joe animated series voiced by William Callaway and understudied by Dan Gilvezan in "Let's Play Soldier." He served as fourth in the G.I. Joe chain of command, but sometimes shared his command with Sgt. Slaughter. In the episode "The Most Dangerous Thing in the World", Serpentor mentioned to Doctor Mindbender that General Hawk is at the head of the team, followed by Duke, Flint, Beachhead and finally Sgt. Slaughter.

Unlike in the comics, where he was calm and cool-headed, Beach Head was portrayed as being short-tempered; he was also shown to long for the command he felt he deserved and was very strict concerning the rules, showing intense disapproval for the relationships between Flint and Lady Jaye, as well as Duke and Scarlett, because romance between Joes is against regulations. Beachhead also had a small rivalry with Flint on who was the best leader. He was also shown to have a dislike of the pacifist Lifeline's presence in the team, implying that if he had his way, he would expel him from the Joe team.

In the five-part mini-series "Arise, Serpentor, Arise!", Beach Head is introduced as the fourth in command of G.I. Joe. He is skeptical of the new Joes, and disciplines them for losing their focus. He later infiltrates the Dreadnoks' camp with Sgt. Slaughter and Low-Light, learning about a Cobra plot to raid the tombs of some of history's most infamous military leaders. Beach Head is among the Joes sent to Transylvania, where he and Mainframe take shelter in the actual coffin of Vlad Tepes from his crumbling castle. It is then revealed that Beach Head does not use deodorant.

In a public service announcement, Beachhead, along with Cross-Country, advises kids to wear helmets for protection when driving ATV motorcycles.

G.I. Joe: The Movie
Beach Head appeared in G.I. Joe: The Movie as the instructor for the Rawhides, probationary recruits for the G.I. Joe Team who had yet to complete their training. He takes each of the recruits through different training exercises, and is frustrated with their unconventional methods of performing each action despite they passed their training exercises.

Spy Troops and Valor vs. Venom
Beach Head appeared in the direct-to-video CGI animated movie G.I. Joe: Spy Troops voiced by Matt Hill, and in G.I. Joe: Valor vs. Venom voiced by Lee Tockar.

Resolute
Beach Head appeared in G.I. Joe: Resolute in the briefing room and on a mission in the jungle alongside Stalker, Gung-Ho and Roadblock.

Video games
Beach Head appears as a playable character in the video game G.I. Joe: The Rise of Cobra voiced by Joe Hanna.

References

External links
 Beach Head at JMM's G.I. Joe Comics Home Page
 Beach Head at YOJOE.com

Comics characters introduced in 1986
Fictional characters from Alabama
Fictional commanders
Fictional gunfighters
Fictional staff sergeants
Fictional United States Army Rangers personnel
G.I. Joe soldiers
Male characters in animated series
Male characters in comics